is a fictional character from the Japanese media franchise Slayers. In it, he is a mighty yet dimwitted warrior who becomes a travelling companion and self-appointed guardian of the protagonist sorceress Lina Inverse. Despite being one of the most prominent character within the series (along with Lina and Naga the Serpent from the prequel stories), he provides comic relief even within a series that is already primarily a comedy to begin with.

Gourry is portrayed as heroic, having a calm demeanor and a chivalrous attitude that serves as a foil to Lina Inverse's fiery temper tantrums and greedy disposition. He is also characterized by his lack of intelligence and his tendency to put things bluntly without any tact, occasionally hurting the feelings of others or humiliating Lina without meaning to. It has been implied his relative lack of development is due to the fact Gourry probably is not very proud of his past.

Character

Characterization and appearances
Aged around 20, Gourry is the tallest of the main cast (6'3" or 191 cm, which is considered quite tall by Japanese standards) and the oldest human of the party. He is handsome and well built, with long blonde hair and blue eyes, and notorious for his poor memory and also limited intelligence. He is one of the few characters who can eat almost as much as Lina Inverse, even accounting for the fact he is much taller and structurally larger than she is.

Gourry is first seen when he finds Lina (with Naga the Serpent in Kadokawa Shoten Tsubasa's paperback edition) confronting the surviving members of the Dragon's Fangs gang (she had previously decimated most of their band, killing their leader, and took a fair chunk of their treasure for herself). Believing Lina to be "a luscious damsel in distress," Gourry steps in and defeats the bandits. When Gourry discovers that Lina is not the beautiful maiden he had thought but merely an underdeveloped teenager he is in disappointment, much to the embarrassment and humiliation of Lina (who was not even in any danger given her powers as a sorceress). Assuming that Lina is a lost little girl, he offers to escort her "home", but she plays along with his misconception and he vows to escort her there at any cost. Along the way, Gourry shifts gears into the more familiar nice guy persona that would define him for the remainder of the series.

Gourry remains Lina's closest, most consistent companion throughout the series, traveling with her even when their other two friends, Zelgadis and Amelia, are off somewhere else. Though Lina once claimed she only let him tag along because she wanted his family heirloom, the legendary Sword of Light, they continued to travel together long after the weapon was no longer in Gourry's possession, with Lina instead saying she stayed with him so she could help find him a new sword. Despite her frustrations with Gourry's seemingly apparent lack of mental agility, among his other habits such as making frequent blunt observation about Lina's less-than-favorable traits (which usually results in Lina abusing him with objects and nasty spells), Lina eventually falls in love with him, and he apparently falls in love with her. Despite this, their relationship never blossoms fully within either the manga, light novels or the anime. However, this lack of a developing relationship is partly because Lina, as an excitable, whimsical but not fully emotionally matured teenager, is not adept at expressing affectionate or romantic feelings. Instead, their relationship is referred to and makes presence in the series through slightly more subtle ways other than blatant public affection. The two have proven to be a highly effective pair in battle, and often can sense what the other is thinking. They get a sort of closure when they share a kiss at the end of the anime series Slayers Next when Gourry came to rescue Lina from the Lord of Nightmares, but they did not remember it afterwards. In the anime series Slayers  Evolution-R, a character inquires "You love Lina, don't you?" out loud to Gourry; while Lina stumbles through a denial in embarrassment, Gourry does not vocalize a denial at all. At the end of the fifteenth volume of the original novel series when Gourry asks Lina to visit back her hometown in Zephillia, Lina thinks that he is proposing to her and that is the reason he wants to visit her family.

Though his intelligence in most every day things is severely lacking, he is an incredible swordsman, performing extremely well against both regular and supernatural foes in the heat of battle. He also often shows excellent skills of observation, intuition, and is a good judge of character, though sometimes it comes a bit late to be of any good. A rather notable example of his exceptional observational skills is that he apparently figured out Xellos was not human long before anyone else did. When questioned about why he never said anything sooner about it, Gourry further dumbfounded everyone when he stated he thought it was obvious. He also noted in the novels that he was well aware that Lina was a sorceress when he first met her. While Gourry may not be the smartest of characters, his ignorance is purposefully beneficial to helping the audience understand what is going on; hence making him a device for exposition. The other three main characters are well educated and have knowledge regarding the cosmology and history of the world which is assumed everyone in the world would know. Since Gourry, however, does not know or remember these facts, it forces the other three to verbalize these facts, which allows for the audience to learn what is assumed to be well known - even the author himself admitted to be making use of this fact. In the original novels, his intelligence is portrayed more as tactless and slightly out of-the-loop rather than idiotic, as the novels are written from Lina's point of view and thus she is able to explain situations through narration rather than having to resort to Gourry's supposed faulty memory. In the novels, it is also heavily implied that Gourry tends to purposely obfuscate his intelligence most of the time to annoy or tease Lina, as well as deceive others into underestimating him.

To his credit, Gourry is extremely loyal to his friends and allies and has displayed a great deal of patience with Lina and her tantrums. The only time his own patience is questioned is when he does not have access to food, much like Lina, as they both share a great passion for fine cooking. Another notable occasion where his temperament was strained is when he was led to believe that Lina was dead in order to deceive the enemy (He openly cries and expresses murderous rage toward her would-be killer), for which, for the first time ever in the series he whacks Lina in the head in way of admonishment for worrying him (in which Lina, bashfully and uncharacteristically, apologizes). In the novels, Gourry will also release an aura of killing intent when he is seriously angered, which intimidates even Lina.

Besides the main Slayers light novel series, manga, and all of anime television series, Gourry also appears as a playable character in all of the Slayers video games and in some other media such as the film Slayers Premium. He is also featured in various assorted Slayers merchandise items such as figures, and has made guest appearances in several non-Slayers video games including Heroes Phantasia, La Tale, Granblue Fantasy, Valkyrie Anatomia: The Origin, LINE Rangers, Puzzle & Dragons, Tales of the Rays: Last Cradle, Overlord: Mass for the Dead, and Ragnarok M (China exclusive). In the science fiction themed series Lost Universe, Slayers creator Hajime Kanzaka's another media franchise, Lina and Gourry were mixed to create its male protagonist Kain Blueriver, complete with its version of the Sword of Light, called Psi-Blade.

Background
Very little is known about Gourry's immediate family and past, as he hardly if ever makes any mention of it, preferring rather to live in the present rather than dwell on the past. What is known is that he at least has a grandmother, a father and a brother, the latter of which he is supposedly on bad terms with, and his hometown has been mentioned to be within the Elmekian empire. It was also implied that Gourry's father was a cruel individual. He is the descendant of the Swordsman of Light that many years ago slew the Demon Beast Zanaffar that terrorized the city of Sairaag. His family often feuded between themselves over who would become heir to the Sword of Light. It was also revealed in an interview by Kanzaka that Gourry's brother was killed as a result of the internal strife within the family. When Gourry was 17, he stole the sword and ran away from home in attempt to stop the fighting. He was a wandering mercenary for the following several years (even participating in a war), and nearly threw away the Sword of Light when he grew frustrated with the weapon. A short story "The Things That He Sees Beyond the Point of His Sword", details his inner struggle and his change of heart: When Gourry was just about to chuck the heirloom into the sea, he was stopped by a traveling fisherman, who convinces Gourry to do something worthwhile with the sword. In a strange twist of fate, it turns out this man is Lina's father, though neither Lina or Gourry are aware of this. Several days later, Gourry runs into Lina herself, and from that point on he is seldom seen without her. The only time his backstory was ever covered it did not come from his mouth nor did it take place in the present, alluding to the fact Gourry probably does not like talking about it.

The biggest areas of dispute regarding Gourry's ancestry centers around Slayers The Motion Picture. In the movie, Rowdy Gabriev is established as Gourry's ancestor - most likely his grandfather. This has led many fans to believe that the elf princess Meiroon, who Rowdy has a crush on, is Gourry's grandmother. Kanzaka has struck down this notion, saying that by the time Rowdy was old enough to marry and have children that Meiroon would have still been a child herself, so Rowdy married a human causing his grandson, Gourry, to be fully human instead of part-elf as it was commonly assumed. In a later interview, Hajime Kanzaka would reveal that the original Swordsman of Light was a woman who traveled with a male Golden Dragon, and implied that their relationship was intimate. This has led to speculation of whether Gourry is actually part-dragon.

Skills
He has displayed limited degrees of superhuman strength/stamina and a great deal of acrobatic prowess, in stark contrast to his companions who rely more on their magic while Gourry himself is not a magic user. Due to his constant exposure and sometimes being the receiving end of many spells, Gourry has developed a rather high toleration to magical attacks and damage in general. Hajime Kanzaka also revealed in an interview that Gourry possesses a magical capacity that rivals Lina's. However, he further explained that Gourry would be incapable of utilizing spells due to his inadequate memory.

While he is handy with any blunt object, Gourry's biggest contribution to a fight is his swordsmanship. Not only does Gourry reveal himself to be a nearly invincible swordsman, he is found to be the owner of the Sword of Light, also known Gorun Nova, a legendary weapon which, when not possessing a metal blade, produces a blade of pure energy, which Gourry can activate by voice. The energy blade, which functions like a lightsaber from Star Wars, can cut through almost anything and even absorb, store and then release magic spells against his enemies. When Phibrizzo released the seal on Sword of Light that withheld its full power, it was capable of firing beams of pure energy as well. His swordsmanship is downplayed as the series progresses in favor of the magic, but one occasion when he was placed under a spell and turned against his comrades he proved to be nigh unbeatable. It is explained that the Sword of Light channels and amplifies the willpower of the wielder to create the blade, which would explain his enhanced power when under mind control as his will would have been reinforced by the one controlling him. The sword was later revealed to be not a weapon of light, but a weapon more closely associated with the mazoku, specifically Dark Star Dugradigdo.

In the novels, he later procures a new sword called the Blast Sword, which absorbs the magical energies around the immediate area to sharpen the edge of its blade. It was even powerful enough to wound the astral body of the dark lord, Ruby Eye Shabranigdo.  He has been shown to have moderate skills as a blacksmith, and can apparently repair his sword in a ridiculously short amount of time.

Reception
Gourry Gabriev received Animage magazine's Anime Grand Prix awards for the best male hero of 1996 and 1997, placing tenth and eight respectively. Nate Ming from Crunchyroll noted Gourry for "being the absolute stupidest character in all of Slayers (and possibly all of anime history)." According to Caitlin Donovan  from The Mary Sue, Lina "and her love interest Gourry are a pretty strong reversal of typical shonen gender tropes, as he flat-out states that his only goal in life is to be with her and help her while she does her thing." Michael Toole from Anime News Network included the "weird, awkward romance between Lina and Gourry" among the series' high points. In 2013, Chris Homer from The Fandom Post ranked the relationship between Lina and the "a lovable dumb ox" Gourry as the 35th top pair in all anime.

References

Animated human characters
Anime and manga characters with superhuman strength
Anime and manga sidekicks
Fantasy film characters
Fantasy television characters
Fictional characters who can manipulate light
Fictional characters with absorption or parasitic abilities
Fictional energy swordfighters
Fictional male martial artists
Fictional mercenaries
Fictional swordfighters in anime and manga
Literary characters introduced in 1989
Male characters in anime and manga
Martial artist characters in anime and manga
Slayers characters